Zeadmete verheckeni is a species of sea snail, a marine gastropod mollusk in the family Cancellariidae, the nutmeg snails.

The specific name verheckeni is in honor of Belgian malacologist André Verhecken.

Description

Distribution
South Africa

References

Cancellariidae
Gastropods described in 2000